Peace on Earth is a one-reel 1939 Metro-Goldwyn-Mayer cartoon short directed by Hugh Harman, about a post-apocalyptic world populated only by animals, as it is claimed in the short that human beings have gone extinct due to war.

Plot
Two young squirrels ask their grandfather (voiced by Mel Blanc) on Christmas Eve who the "men" are in the lyric "Peace on Earth, good will to men." The grandfather squirrel then tells them a history of the human race, focusing on the never-ending wars men waged. Ultimately the wars do end, with the deaths of the last men on Earth, two soldiers shooting each other, one shoots the other soldier and the injured soldier kills the last, but slowly dies as he sinks into a watery foxhole while his hand grasps into the water. Afterwards, the surviving animals discover a copy of an implied Bible in the ruins of a church. Inspired by the book's teachings, they decide to rebuild a society dedicated to peace and nonviolence (using the helmets of the soldiers to construct houses). The short features a version of "Hark! The Herald Angels Sing" with rewritten lyrics, and a trio of carolers sing this song outside of the squirrels' house.

Accolades
According to Hugh Harman's obituary in The New York Times and Ben Mankiewicz, host of Cartoon Alley, the cartoon was nominated for a Nobel Peace Prize. However, it is not listed in the official Nobel Prize nomination database. Mankiewicz also claimed that the cartoon was the first about a serious subject by a major studio. In 1994, it was voted #40 of the 50 Greatest Cartoons of all time by members of the animation field.

It was also nominated for the 1939 Academy Award for Short Subjects (Cartoons). It did not claim that honor (which instead went to Walt Disney's Silly Symphony The Ugly Duckling).

Remake

Fred Quimby, William Hanna and Joseph Barbera remade the cartoon in CinemaScope in 1955. This post-World War II version of the film, entitled Good Will to Men, featured updated and even more destructive forms of warfare technology such as flamethrowers, bazookas, missiles, and nuclear weapons. This version used a choir of mice as the main characters including a deacon mouse who tells the story to his charges, and also had more direct religious references (though the Bible is simply referred to as "the book of humans' rules" in both), Good Will to Men includes a reference to the New Testament, while Peace on Earth only includes verses from the Old Testament). This new version was also nominated for the Best Animated Short Subject Oscar. This film would be the last animated production for producer Fred Quimby before his retirement in May 1955.

See also
 List of Christmas films

References

External links

 
 Peace on Earth at the TCM Movie Database
 
 Good Will to Men at the TCM Movie Database
 

1939 films
1930s color films
1939 animated films
1930s American animated films
1930s animated short films
1930s science fiction films
1930s Christmas films
American Christmas films
American animated science fiction films
Anti-war films
American dystopian films
Films about Christianity
Films directed by Hugh Harman
Metro-Goldwyn-Mayer animated short films
Animated post-apocalyptic films
Metro-Goldwyn-Mayer films
Films scored by Scott Bradley
1930s political films
1930s war drama films
Animated Christmas films
1939 short films
1939 drama films
Films produced by Fred Quimby
Metro-Goldwyn-Mayer cartoon studio short films
Rotoscoped films